University of Agricultural Sciences could refer to one of two state agriculture universities in India started on the land grant university pattern.
 University of Agricultural Sciences, Dharwad
 University of Agricultural Sciences, Bangalore